Charlotte Public Schools is a school district in Michigan. Dr. Mandy Stewart is the current superintendent of schools. Charlotte is the county seat, with a population of approximately 8,500. The schools are accredited by the North Central Association.

The information below is current as of 2021.

See also
List of school districts in Michigan

Schools

External links

School districts in Michigan
Education in Eaton County, Michigan